Iver Sletten (born 24 July 1974) is a retired Norwegian football striker.

After three seasons in Hamarkameratene he joined Skeid Fotball in 1998. In 2002, he played for Bærum SK, and in 2003 for Groruddalen BK which started a quick ascent from the 3. divisjon.

References

1974 births
Living people
Norwegian footballers
Hamarkameratene players
Skeid Fotball players
Bærum SK players
Eliteserien players
Norwegian First Division players

Association football forwards